Muhammad Khairulazhan bin Mohd Khalid (born 7 November 1989) is a Malaysian professional footballer who plays as a goalkeeper for Selangor and the Malaysia national team.

Club career

Youth
The Kuantan-born custodian began his career as a footballer with Pahang U-21 as the main goalkeeper of the team. Khairulazhan participated in the 2010 Sukma Games, representing Pahang state. Khairulazhan continued his development through Pahang FA feeder team, Shahzan Muda in the FAM League.

Pahang
Khairulazhan signed with Pahang in 2013, and was Dollah Salleh's third choice goalkeeper in early 2013 season but injuries to Rosfaizul Azuar Ali and Nasril Nourdin in April 2013 saw the budding goalkeeper called into action. Khairulazhan made his competitive first appearance for Pahang in a 2–1 league match win over T-Team on 13 April 2013. He came on in the 71st minute to replace injured Rosfaizul Azuar. On 16 April 2013, Khairulazhan made his Malaysia FA Cup debut a 0–2 victory over Sime Darby. In his first season at Pahang, Khairulazhan finished his first season, making 9 league appearances and 2 clean sheets.

In his second season at Pahang, Khairulazhan continued to remain a first choice goalkeeper this season following the departure of Rosfaizul Azuar to Kuantan. On 17 January 2014, Khairulazhan made his Sultan Haji Ahmad Shah Cup debut against LionsXII.

On 13 November 2014, Khairulazhan won two awards in the National Football Awards. He won the Best Goalkeeper Award and the Most Valuable Players Award for 2014. Khairulazhan is the key player in Pahang's successful season in 2014 when his club won the Malaysia FA Cup and Malaysia Cup. Khairulazhan made 2 clean sheets, conceded 10 goals in 6 appearances during 2015 AFC Cup campaign. His debut was 2–3 win against Yadanarbon on 25 February 2015.

Selangor
In December 2015, Khairulazhan left Pahang to sign with Selangor. Khairulazhan made his competitive debut for the club against Petaling Jaya Rangers on 19 February 2016 in the Malaysia FA Cup. He made his Super League debut in a 1–3 away win over Pahang on 27 February 2017. Khairulazhan made 1 appearance in 2016 AFC Cup on 10 May 2016 in a 1–0 defeat to Tampines Rovers.

International career
On 14 February 2014, Khairulazhan earned his first national call up for Malaysia's training squad preparation for 2015 AFC Asian Cup qualification match against Yemen. Khairulazhan made his debut in a friendly against Philippines on 1 March 2014. Khairul received praises from the media and also his coach Ong Kim Swee, after his performances keeping a clean sheet in the 0–0 draw. Khairulazhan however was unable to play against Yemen due to injuries sustained in the Philippines match.

Career statistics

Club

International

Honours

Club
Sri Pahang
 Malaysia Cup: 2013, 2014
 FA Cup: 2014
 Malaysia Charity Shield: 2014

International
AFF Suzuki Cup runner-up: 2014

Individual
 Most Valuable Player: 2014
 Best Goalkeeper: 2014

References

External links
 
 
 

1989 births
Living people
Malaysian footballers
Malaysia international footballers
Sri Pahang FC players
Selangor FA players
People from Pahang
Malaysia Super League players
Association football goalkeepers
Malaysian people of Malay descent